Runcinida is a order of medium-sized sea slugs, marine opisthobranch gastropod mollusks.

Superfamilies
 Runcinoidea H. Adams & A. Adams, 1854

References

Tectipleura